The Roraima gubernatorial election was held on 5 October 2014 to elect the next governor of the state of Roraima. If no candidate receives more than 50% of the vote, a second-round runoff election will be held on 26 October.  Governor Chico Rodrigues is running for his first full term after assuming the Governorship in April 2014.

References

2014 Brazilian gubernatorial elections
Roraima gubernatorial elections
October 2014 events in South America